Jailbird or Jail Bird may refer to:

Arts and entertainment
 The Jailbird, a 1920 US film
 Jailbird (novel), a 1979 book by Kurt Vonnegut
 "Jailbird", a song on the 1994 album Give Out But Don't Give Up by Primal Scream
Jail Birds, a 1914 American silent short drama film
Jail Birds of Paradise, a 1934 American film
Jailbirds (1940 film), a British film
Jailbirds (1991 film), an American television film
Jailbirds (2015 film), a French-Belgian film
Jailbirds (TV series), a 2019 Netflix reality television series

Other uses
Jailbirds of Kerensky, a term for some prisoners released during the Russian Revolution

See also
 Yardbird (disambiguation)